Ruth Jennifer Ondo Mouchita (born 1992) is a Gabonese beauty pageant titleholder who was crowned Miss Gabon 2013 and served as the representative of Gabon in Miss Universe 2013.

Miss Gabon 2013
The representative of the Haut-Ogooué province, Jennifer Ondo Mouchita has been crowned Miss Gabon 2013 by Miss Gabon 2012 Marie-Noëlle Ada during a festive gala at the finals of the most beautiful woman of Gabon held in December 22. 2013 at the "City of Democracy" in Libreville.

Miss Universe 2013
Jennifer Ondo from Libreville represented the country at the 2013 Miss Universe pageant at the Crocus City Hall in Moscow, Russia on November 9 after she was named Most Beautiful Women of Gabon. However, she did not make it to the top 15.

References

1992 births
Living people
Miss Universe 2013 contestants
Gabonese beauty pageant winners